This is a list of notable hotels and inns in the United Kingdom.

England

Bedfordshire

Flitwick Manor, Flitwick
Luton Hoo, Luton

Berkshire

Aldermaston Court
Berystede
Coworth House
Donnington Grove
Elcot Park Hotel
Great House at Sonning
Monkey Island, Bray
Oakley Court
Royal Berkshire Hotel

Reading

Roseate Reading
The George Hotel
Malmaison Hotel
Millennium Madejski Hotel

City of Bristol

Palace Hotel

Buckinghamshire

Cliveden
The Crown
Danesfield House
Hartwell House
Skindles

Cambridgeshire

The Bull Hotel, Cambridge
The Bull Hotel, Peterborough
George Hotel, Stamford
Grange Hotel, Brampton
Spinney Abbey

Cheshire

Chester Grosvenor and Spa
Crewe Hall
Crown Hotel
Higher Huxley Hall, Huxley
Old Hall Hotel
Peckforton Castle
Queen Hotel, Chester
Rookery Hall
Rowton Hall

Cornwall

Carbis Bay Hotel
Chymorvah House, Marazion
Costislost
Falmouth Hotel
Headland Hotel
Jamaica Inn
Mount Haven Hotel, Marazion
Nansloe Manor
The Sloop Inn
Tregenna Castle

Cumbria

Abbey House, Barrow-in-Furness
Britannia Inn
The Bull Hotel, Sedbergh
Dalston Hall
The Duke of Edinburgh Hotel
Gilsland Spa
Hipping Hall
Howtown Hotel
Moresby Hall
Overwater Hall
Rothay Manor, Ambleside
Sharrow Bay
Storrs Hall
The Traveller's Rest, Grasmere
Underscar Manor, Applethwaite
Windermere Hotel

Derbyshire

Breadsall Priory
Callow Hall, Ashbourne
Midland Hotel, Derby
Old Hall Hotel
St Helen's House

Devon

The Barn, Exmouth
Burgh Island Hotel
Churston Court Inn
Corbyn Head Hotel
The Fisherman's Cot
Gleneagles Hotel, Torquay
The Grand Hotel, Torquay
Howden Court Hotel, Torquay
Royal Castle Hotel, Dartmouth
The Three Crowns Hotel

Dorset

Bournemouth Highcliff Marriott Hotel
Crown Hotel, Poole
Haven Hotel
Langtry Manor
Mortons House Hotel, Corfe Castle
Norfolk Royale Hotel
Riviera Hotel
Royal Bath Hotel
Royal Lion Hotel
Sandbanks Hotel

County Durham

Blackwell Grange Hotel
The Lord Crewe Arms Hotel
Lumley Castle
Seaham Hall

East Sussex

Brickwall House Hotel
Claremont (Burlington) Hotel
Grand Hotel Eastbourne
Horsted Place
The Mermaid Inn

Brighton and Hove

Bedford Hotel
Grand Hotel
Hilton Brighton Metropole
Royal Albion Hotel

Gloucestershire

Bibury Court
Speech House
Stonehouse Court Hotel
Thornbury Castle
Tortworth Court

Greater London

41 Hotel
Abbey Court Hotel
The Academy
The Athenaeum Hotel
Baglioni Hotel
Bell Savage Inn
The Bentley London
The Berkeley
Blakes Hotel
Brown's Hotel
Capital Hotel
Carlton Hotel, London
Charlotte Street Hotel
Churchill Hotel
Claridge's
Colonnade Hotel, London
The Connaught
Courthouse Hotel
Covent Garden Hotel
The Dorchester
100 Queen's Gate Hotel London
Draycott Hotel
Driscoll House
Durrants
Egerton House Hotel
Four Seasons Canary Wharf
Four Seasons London
Franklin Hotel, London
Goring Hotel
Grange Holborn Hotel
Grosvenor House Hotel
Halkin Hotel
Hazlitt's
Hempel Hotel
Hilton London Metropole
Hilton London Paddington
Hotel Cecil
Hotel Russell
InterContinental London
Jumeirah Carlton Tower
The Landmark London
The Lanesborough
Langham Hotel, London
London Hilton on Park Lane
Mandarin Oriental Hyde Park, London
Marriott London Park Lane
Marriott West India Quay
Le Meridien Hotel Piccadilly
Metropole Hotel, London
Millennium Bailey's Hotel
Millennium Hotel Mayfair
One Aldwych
Orchard Court
Park Lane Hotel
Park Lane Mews Hotel
Radisson Blu Edwardian Hampshire Hotel
Radisson Blu Edwardian Heathrow Hotel
Rafayel on the Left Bank
Renaissance Chancery Court Hotel
Ritz Hotel
Royal Garden Hotel
Royal Horseguards Hotel
Samarkand Hotel
San Domenico House
Sanderson Hotel
Savoy Hotel
Selsdon Park Hotel
Sheraton Park Tower Hotel
Sheraton Skyline Hotel at London Heathrow
Sofitel St. James
Soho Hotel
St James's Club and Hotel
St. Pancras Renaissance London Hotel
Strand Palace Hotel
Swissôtel The Howard
Threadneedles Hotel
Tower Hotel, London
Trafalgar Hilton
Waldorf Hilton
YOTEL

Greater Manchester

Manchester

Chancellors Hotel & Conference Centre
Free Trade Hall
Midland Hotel, Manchester
Refuge Assurance Building
Watts Warehouse
Corn Exchange, Manchester

Salford

Lowry Hotel

Hampshire

Balmer Lawn
Chewton Glen
Hotel Terravina
Lainston House
Queens Hotel, Southsea

Herefordshire

Burton Court, Eardisland
The Chase Hotel, Ross-On-Wye
Glewstone Court Hotel
Rhydspence Inn
The Stagg Inn
Sun Inn

Hertfordshire

The Brocket Arms
Brocket Hall
Fanhams Hall
The Grove, Watford
Hanbury Manor
Hunton Park
Sopwell House

Isle of Wight

Farringford House

Kent

Hotel du Vin, Tunbridge Wells
Larkfield Priory Hotel
Fleur de Lis Hotel

Lancashire

The Cartford Inn
The Imperial Hotel Blackpool
Midland Hotel, Morecambe
Norbreck Castle Hotel
Whitewell Hotel

Leicestershire

Bosworth Hall, Market Bosworth
The City Rooms, Leicester
Grand Hotel, Leicester
Kilworth House

Lincolnshire

Stoke Rochford Hall

Merseyside
Hill Bark
Thornton Manor

Liverpool

30 James St
62 Castle St
Britannia Adelphi Hotel
Crowne Plaza Liverpool John Lennon Airport Hotel
Hampton by Hilton Liverpool John Lennon Airport
Hard Days Night Hotel
Hope Street Hotel
Malmaison Hotel
Doubletree Hilton
Radisson Red
Marriott Aloft
Thistle Atlantic Tower

Norfolk

Bell Hotel, Thetford
Cliftonville Hotel, Cromer
Dales Country House Hotel, Upper Sheringham
Duke's Head Hotel, King's Lynn
Dunston Hall Hotel
Durdans, Mundesley
George Hotel, Swaffham
Golden Lion Hotel, Hunstanton
Griffin Hotel, Attleborough
Hotel de Paris, Cromer
The Lifeboat Inn, Thornham
Links Hotel, West Runton
Lynford Hall
Maids Head Hotel, Norwich
Manor Hotel, Mundesley
The Red Lion Hotel, Cromer
Royal Hotel, Great Yarmouth
Sandcliff Hotel, Cromer
Sea Marge Hotel, Overstrand
Sprowston Manor
Star Hotel, Great Yarmouth

Northamptonshire
Talbot Hotel, Oundle

Northumberland

Clennell Hall, Clennell
Embleton Hall, Morpeth
Langley Castle Hotel
Marshall Meadows Country House Hotel, near Berwick-upon-Tweed
Matfen Hall Hotel, Matfen
Otterburn Hall Hotel, Otterburn
Schooner Hotel, Alnmouth
The White Swan Hotel, Alnwick

North Yorkshire

Clifton Hotel
Crown Spa Hotel
Grand Hotel, Scarborough
Hazlewood Castle
Holbeck Hall Hotel
DoubleTree by Hilton Harrogate Majestic Hotel & Spa
Middlethorpe Hall
Old Swan Hotel
Swinton Park Hotel

Nottinghamshire

Oxfordshire

Bear Hotel
French Horn, Sonning Eye
Holt Hotel
Le Manoir aux Quat' Saisons

Oxford

Eastgate Hotel
Randolph Hotel, Oxford
The Old Bank Hotel, Oxford
Oxford Castle

Rutland

Hambleton Hall

Shropshire

The Bull Hotel, Ludlow
Feathers Hotel, Ludlow
Fitz Manor
The Royal Victoria Hotel
Soulton Hall

Somerset

Ashwick House (near Dulverton)
Babington House
Castle Hotel, Taunton
Empire Hotel, Bath
George Hotel and Pilgrims' Inn, Glastonbury
Ston Easton Park
Tasburgh House Hotel

South Yorkshire

Adelphi Hotel, Sheffield
Aston Hall

Staffordshire

Etruria Hall
North Stafford Hotel

Suffolk

Surrey

Burford Bridge Hotel
Great Fosters
Lakeside Leisure Complex
Pennyhill Park Hotel

Tyne and Wear

Warwickshire

The Belfry
Coombe Abbey
Lord Leycester Hotel
The Regent Hotel

West Midlands

Birmingham

Grand Hotel, Birmingham
Hyatt Regency Birmingham
Jurys Inn Birmingham
Moor Hall Hotel
New Hall Manor
Penns Hall
The Pitman Vegetarian Hotel
Snowhill

West Sussex

Amberley Castle, Amberley
The George Hotel, Crawley
Mannings Heath Golf Club
South Lodge Hotel

West Yorkshire

42 The Calls
George Hotel, Huddersfield
The Met Hotel, Leeds
Midland Hotel, Bradford
Oakwood Hall
Park Plaza Hotel Leeds
Quebecs Hotel, Leeds
Queens Hotel, Leeds
Wood Hall Country House Hotel

Wiltshire

Bishopstrow House
The Black Swan Hotel, Devizes
Guyers House Hotel
Littlecote House
Manor House Hotel
The Old Bell
Whatley Manor

Worcestershire

Chateau Impney
Fownes Hotel and Restaurant

Northern Ireland

Belfast

Europa Hotel
Grand Central Hotel
Malmaison Hotel
Merchant Hotel
Ten Square

County Antrim

Ballygally Castle

County Armagh

Tí Chulainn

County Fermanagh

Killyhevlin Hotel
Manor House Resort Hotel

Scotland

Aberdeen

Aberdeenshire

Craigendarroch Resort
Cruden Bay Hotel
Waverley Hotel

Angus

Kinnettles Castle

Argyll and Bute

Argyll Hotel
Balmory Hall
Barcaldine Castle
Barcaldine House
Colintraive Hotel
George Hotel
Glenburn Hotel
Hunters Quay Hotel
Oban Hydro
Queen's Hotel
Royal Marine Hotel
Tiroran Country House Hotel
Whistlefield Inn

Clackmannanshire

Dumfries and Galloway

Auchen Castle Hotel
Cally Palace
Corsewall Lighthouse
North West Castle

Dundee

East Ayrshire

East Dunbartonshire

East Lothian

Carberry Tower
Greywalls

East Renfrewshire

Edinburgh

Balmoral Hotel
Dalmahoy
The Dunstane
The George Hotel, Edinburgh
The Glasshouse
Hotel Indigo Edinburgh
Prestonfield House
Salisbury Green
The Scotsman Hotel
Tailor's Hall
Waldorf Astoria Edinburgh - The Caledonian
Waterloo Hotel

Falkirk

Fife

Balbirnie House
Fairmont St Andrews
Old Course Hotel
Rufflets Hotel
Rusacks Hotel

Glasgow

Bellgrove Hotel
Beresford Hotel
Central Hotel
Crowne Plaza Glasgow
Elmbank Gardens
Hilton Glasgow
One Devonshire Gardens
St Andrew House

Highland

Ackergill Tower
The Albannach
Clachaig Inn
Drumossie Hotel
Glenelg Inn
Huna House
Inverlochy Castle Hotel
Kings House Hotel
Kinloch Lodge
The Lovat Hotel
Scottish Highlander (barge)
Tulloch Castle

Inverclyde

Midlothian

Moray

North Ayrshire

Burnhouse Manor

North Lanarkshire

Orkney Islands

Perth and Kinross

Ballathie House
Atholl Arms Hotel (Blair Atholl)
Atholl Arms Hotel (Dunkeld)
Crieff Hydro
Cromlix House
Dunalastair Hotel
Gleneagles Hotel
Parklands Hotel
Perth Arms Hotel
Queens Hotel
Royal George Hotel
Salutation Hotel
Station Hotel
Taybank Hotel

Renfrewshire

Erskine Bridge Hotel & Spa
Mar Hall
Normandy Hotel

Scottish Borders

Crook Inn
Dryburgh Abbey Hotel
Peebles Hydro
Stobo Castle

South Ayrshire

Glenapp Castle
Turnberry Hotel

South Lanarkshire

Shieldhill Castle

Stirling

West Dunbartonshire

West Lothian

Wales

Blaenau Gwent

Bridgend

Seabank Hotel, Porthcawl

Caerphilly

Cardiff

Angel Hotel
Cardiff Marriott Hotel
Copthorne Hotel, Cardiff
Helmont House
Hilton Cardiff
Royal Hotel
St David's Hotel & Spa

Carmarthenshire

Brown's Hotel

Ceredigion

 Castle Hotel, Aberaeron
Harbourmaster Hotel, Aberaeron

Conwy

Bodysgallen Hall
Castle Hotel

Denbighshire

Owain Glyndwr Hotel, Corwen

Flintshire

Northop Hall Country House Hotel

Gwynedd

Black Boy Inn, Caernarfon
St David's Hotel, Harlech

Isle of Anglesey

The Bull Hotel, Llangefni

Merthyr Tydfil

Monmouthshire

The Angel Hotel, Abergavenny
The Angel Hotel, Monmouth
The Beaufort Arms Hotel, Monmouth
The Beaufort Hotel, Chepstow
The Crown at Whitebrook
George Hotel, Chepstow
Kings Head Hotel, Monmouth
Llanwenarth House
The Mayhill Hotel, Monmouth
The Riverside Hotel, Monmouth
Royal George Hotel, Tintern

Neath Port Talbot

Newport

Celtic Manor Resort

Pembrokeshire

Cobourg Hotel, Tenby (defunct)
Penally Abbey

Powys

Craig-y-Nos Castle
Llangoed Hall, Llyswen
Maesmawr Hall

Rhondda Cynon Taf

Miskin Manor

Swansea

Morgans Hotel, Swansea

Torfaen

Vale of Glamorgan

Egerton Grey Country House Hotel, Barry
Portobello House, near Ogmore-by-Sea

Wrexham

Rossett Hall, Rossett

See also
 List of country houses in the United Kingdom
 Lists of hotels – an index of hotel list articles on Wikipedia

References

 
United Kingdom